Guttorm Guttormsgaard (13 September 1938 – 26 October 2019)  was a Norwegian visual artist, educator and collector.

Personal life
Guttormsgaard was born on 13 September 1938 in Oslo, to Knut Guttormsgaard and Ingeborg Stenstad. He married Karin Eie in 1940.

His children include actor, musician and screenwriter Aslag Guttormsgaard (b. 1969), and actress, screenwriter and film director Anna Gutto (b. 1977).

Career
From 1967 to 1973 he lectured at the Oslo School of Architecture and Design. He was appointed professor at the Norwegian National Academy of Fine Arts in 1980, and served as rector of the institution from 1983 to 1984.

His public works include La hundre blomster blomstre (1973, in collaboration with ceramist Karin Eie Guttormsgaard), Labyrinten (1989–1993) at the University of Tromsø, and Havet og livshistorien for the Seville Expo '92. He is represented with works in the National Gallery of Norway, Riksgalleriet, Trondheim Art Museum, and other galleries. He illustrated several books, and was awarded  for 2017.

In 2009 he was awarded honorary membership of the association . A collector, he acquired the old dairy in the village of Blaker in Sørum, which he used as atelier and museum, and where he arranged numerous exhibitions. His collection of more than 20,000 artifacts has been donated to a foundation, Guttormsgaards Arkiv.

Guttormsgaard died in October 2019.

References

1938 births
2019 deaths
Artists from Oslo
Norwegian printmakers
Norwegian illustrators
Oslo National Academy of the Arts alumni
Royal Danish Academy of Fine Arts alumni
Academic staff of the Oslo School of Architecture and Design
Academic staff of the Oslo National Academy of the Arts
Collectors from Oslo